Pinki Cultural and Sports Center, commonly known as Pinki Hall, is an indoor multi-sports venue located in Belgrade's municipality of Zemun, Serbia. The venue has an indoor hall and an indoor swimming pool. The hall has a seating capacity of 2,300 for sports events and around 5,000 for concerts.

Opened on 21 October 1974, on the occasion of the 30th anniversary of Zemun being liberated from the Nazis and their puppet state Independent State of Croatia, the hall has hosted various basketball, handball, and volleyball teams. Its initial full official name was Dom sportova, omladine i pionira Pinki (Pinki Hall of Sports, Youth, and Pioneers). It now mostly serves for recreational use. It is the only sports venue in the city of Belgrade not financed by the city government, because Zemun's municipal government headed by the Serbian Radical Party (SRS) in 2000 transformed the venue's controlling entity into a publicly traded company and sold the controlling stake (49%) to Naftna industrija Srbije (NIS) oil company.

The venue is named after Boško Palkovljević Pinki, a prominent Partisan fighter during World War II in Yugoslavia and a People's Hero of Yugoslavia.

Concerts
 27 April 1975 - Bijelo Dugme 
 1975 - Demis Roussos
 22 March 1977 - Status Quo
 4 April 1977 - Shakti
 12 December 1978 - Riblja Čorba
 9 February 1979 - John McLaughlin, Larry Coryell, and Paco de Lucía
 27 April 1979 - Bijelo Dugme 
 4 November 1979 - John McLaughlin, Billy Cobham, Jack Bruce, and Stu Goldberg
 2 December 1979 - Gillan
 December 1979 - Takmičenje pankera
 29 January 1980 - The Ruts
 21 March 1980 - Ginger Baker
 2 April 1980 - Wishbone Ash
 22 April 1980 - Lene Lovich
 31 December 1981 - Bijelo Dugme (Doživjeti stotu Tour)
 1 January 1982 - Bijelo Dugme
 2 January 1982 - Bijelo Dugme
 19 December 1982 - Dr. Feelgood
 27 January 1983 - Alvin Lee
 28 March 1983 - Pat Metheny Group
 1 December 1983 - Uriah Heep
 22 May 1984 - Laki Pingvini
 17 January 1985 - Rory Gallagher
 12 October 1989 - Rock za Bebe (Riblja Čorba; humanitarian concert for the maternity ward in Tiršova Street)

References

Press Online: NA PLAFONU 150 KANTI!, January 16, 2009

See also
List of indoor arenas in Serbia

Indoor arenas in Serbia
Basketball venues in Serbia
Sports venues in Belgrade
KK Mega Basket home arenas
Sport in Zemun